Lawrence "Baby Casius" Austin (born 22 January 1956 in Warrnambool) is an Australian professional super feather/light/light welter/welter/light middle/middleweight boxer of the 1970s and '80s who won the West Australia State welterweight title, West Australia State light middleweight title, Victoria State light middleweight title, Australian lightweight title, Australian light welterweight title, Australian welterweight title, South Seas Light Middleweight Title, and Commonwealth light welterweight title (twice), and was a challenger for the Australian light middleweight title against Russell Sands, and Commonwealth light welterweight title against Jeff Malcolm, his professional fighting weight varied from , i.e. super featherweight to , i.e. middleweight. He was inducted into the Australian National Boxing Hall of Fame in 2008.

Professional boxing record

References

External links

Image - Lawrence Austin

1956 births
Light-middleweight boxers
Lightweight boxers
Light-welterweight boxers
Living people
Middleweight boxers
People from Warrnambool
Super-featherweight boxers
Welterweight boxers
Australian male boxers
Commonwealth Boxing Council champions